The 1993 Davis Cup (also known as the 1993 Davis Cup by NEC for sponsorship purposes) was the 82nd edition of the Davis Cup, the most important tournament between national teams in men's tennis. 100 teams would enter the competition, 16 in the World Group, 22 in the Americas Zone, 23 in the Asia/Oceania Zone, and 39 in the Europe/Africa Zone. Benin, Croatia, the Czech Republic, Djibouti, Latvia, Russia, San Marino, Slovenia, Ukraine and the United Arab Emirates made their first appearances in the tournament.

Germany defeated Australia in the final, held at the Messe Düsseldorf Exhibition Hall in Düsseldorf, Germany, on 3–5 December, to win their 3rd title overall.

World Group

Draw

Final
Germany vs. Australia

World Group Qualifying Round

Date: 22–27 September

The eight losing teams in the World Group first round ties and eight winners of the Zonal Group I final round ties competed in the World Group Qualifying Round for spots in the 1994 World Group.

Americas Zone

Group I

Group II

Group III
 Venue: Cariari Country Club, San José, Costa Rica
 Date: 8–14 March

  and  promoted to Group II in 1994.

Asia/Oceania Zone

Group I

Group II

Group III
 Venue: Khalifa International Tennis and Squash Complex, Doha, Qatar
 Date: 19–25 April

  and  promoted to Group II in 1994.

Europe/Africa Zone

Group I

Group II

Group III

Group A
 Venue: Lusaka Tennis Club, Lusaka, Zambia
 Date: 28 April–2 March

  and  promoted to Group II in 1994.

Group B
 Venue: Marsa Sports Club, Marsa, Malta
 Date: 5–9 March

  and  promoted to Group II in 1994.

Notes

References
General

Specific

External links
Davis Cup Official Website

 
Davis Cups by year
Davis Cup
Davis Cup